Jindřich is a given name. It is the Czech version of the English name Henry.

People with the name include:

Jindřich Bačkovský (1912–2000), Czech physicist
Jindřich Balcar (born 1950), Czechoslovak ski jumper who competed from 1974 to 1976
Jindřich Chmela (1924–2010), Czech Olympic fencer
Jindřich Feld (1925–2007), Czech composer of classical music
Jindřich Kabát (1953–2020), Czech psychologist, professor and politician
Jindřich Krepindl (born 1948), Czechoslovak handball player
Jindřich Svoboda (aviator) (1917–1942), Czech aviator
Jindřich Svoboda (footballer) (born 1952), Czech football player
Josef Jindřich Šechtl (1877–1954), Czech photographer, specialized in photojournalism and portrait photography
Jindřich Šimon Baar (1869–1925), Czech Catholic priest and writer, realist and author
Jindřich Štyrský (1899–1942), Czech Surrealist painter, poet, editor, photographer, and graphic artist
Jindřich Matyáš Thurn (1567–1640), Bohemian nobleman, one of leaders of Thirty Years War, Bohemian Revolt and Battle of White Mountain
Václav Jindřich Veit (1806–1864), Czech composer, copyist, pianist and lawyer
Jindřich Waldes (1876–1941), industrialist, founder of Waldes Koh-i-noor Company, Czech patriot and art collector
Jindřich Wankel (1821–1897), Czech palaeontologist and archaeologist
Jindřich Wybraniec (born 1948), Czechoslovak sprint canoeist, competed in the mid-1970s
Jindřich Zelený (1922–1997), Czech philosopher and the author of several books
Jindřich Zeman, Czechoslovakian luger, competed in the late 1970s and early 1980s